Schiller–Duval body is a cellular structure seen by microscope in endodermal sinus tumors (yolk sac tumors) which are the most common testicular cancer in children. Schiller-Duval bodies are present in approximately 50% of these tumors, and if found are pathognomonic. They are named for Mathias-Marie Duval and Walter Schiller who described them in the late nineteenth century.

Schiller–Duval bodies are said to resemble a glomerulus. They have a mesodermal core with a central capillary, all lined by flattened layers of both visceral and parietal cells. Immunofluorescent stain may show eosinophilic hyalin-like globules both inside and outside the cytoplasm that contain AFP and alpha 1-antitrypsin.

References

Andrology